Lee Sung-jae (born 16 May 1976) is a South Korean footballer.

Football career
He started professional football career with Bucheon SK (currently Jeju United FC) in 1999. He awarded Rookie of the Year of 1999 season.

Honours 
Individual
 K-League Rookie of the Year Award: 1999

References

External links
 

1976 births
Living people
South Korean footballers
Jeju United FC players
Ulsan Hyundai FC players
Busan IPark players
K League 1 players
K3 League players
Korea University alumni
Association football forwards